Pakarinen is a Finnish surname. Notable people with the surname include:

 Ari Pakarinen (born 1969), Finnish javelin thrower
 Esa Pakarinen (1911–1989), Finnish actor and musician
 Esa Pakarinen Junior (born 1947), Finnish actor
 Hanna Pakarinen (born 1981), Finnish singer
 Iiro Pakarinen (born 1991), Finnish professional ice hockey player
 Ilmari Pakarinen (1910–1987), Finnish gymnast
 Kalevi Pakarinen (1935–1999), Finnish fencer
 Pentti Pakarinen (1924–2007), Finnish ophthalmologist and politician
 Pia Pakarinen (born 1990), Finnish actress, model and beauty pageant titleholder

Finnish-language surnames